Les Cabannes is a commune in the Tarn department in southern France. It has 368 inhabitants in 2013.

Geography
The Cérou flows westward through the middle of the commune.

See also
Communes of the Tarn department

References

Communes of Tarn (department)